Gabriel Cole may refer to:

 Gabriel Cole (Medal of Honor) (1831–1907), Union Army soldier and Medal of Honor recipient
 Gabriel Cole (athlete) (born 1992), Australian athlete